GetYourGuide is a Berlin-based online travel agency and online marketplace for tour guides and excursions. It is accessible via website and mobile app for iOS and Android.

GetYourGuide's sells tours and excursions, activities including cooking classes, and tickets to many tourist attractions. It offers more than 60,000 products worldwide in 150 countries, 22 languages, and 40 currencies.

History
The idea for GetYourGuide was conceived in 2007 by co-founders Johannes Reck and Tao Tao. When traveling to Beijing for a student conference with ETH MUN, they found navigating a foreign city as tourists to be difficult. Drawing on that experience, a business plan was developed for a peer-to-peer Internet platform that connected tourists with amateur guides. Later, it was expanded and refined to be an internet booking platform through which travelers could book professional tours and activities in major cities around the world.

The company was initially funded by the founder's parents and relatives. As it grew, there was difficulty in raising capital, in part because the concept was new, information on the size and complexity of the market segment was scarce, and there was no business model or demonstrable path to success. While many European investors balked at the idea, American investors were attracted to the concept, because it represented what they felt to be a good business idea, with no competition.

The business model for GetYourGuide stipulates that it does not offer its own tours or activities, but rather, acts as a mediator between customers and providers. The service is free for customers, but the provider of the tour has to pay GetYourGuide a percentage of its revenue. An online customer review system enables potential customers to assess the quality of tour providers. Additionally, GetYourGuide removes providers who consistently get bad reviews from its inventory. In January 2013, when GetYourGuide announced $14 million in Series A funding, one of the goals was to develop its mobile apps. In October, it launched apps for iOS and Android. The app could pull in info on more than 23,000 tours & activities from 2,200 global destinations then available on the GetYourGuide's platform, presenting them initially as a stack of thumbnails. The app is also able to detect the user's location, and make relevant suggestions.

In April 2013, GetYourGuide acquired Gidsy, which had also been developing mobile apps and had a team of 12 developers.

As a spin-off of ETH, GetYourGuide was initially headquartered in Zurich. The new company relocated its headquarters in 2012 to Berlin, where office space was more affordable and readily available. The German capital was also one of the focal points of the still young European startup ecosystem. An office in Zurich was maintained primarily for engineering teams.

In October 2017, GetYourGuide opened a new engineering office in Zurich.
 
In November 2017, GetYourGuide announced a $75 million Series D funding round raised to help support expansion in Asia and the Americas, and soon after, added traditional Chinese, Japanese, Russian and Mexican Spanish as supported languages for its global inventory. Earlier in the year, regional offices were opened in Hong Kong and Bangkok. These additions brought the total number of languages supported on GetYourGuide to 18.

In August 2018, GetYourGuide began selling tours under its own brand name. The company mined its data on customer preferences from having sold 15 million tours since its founding nearly a decade ago. From that information, it developed standardized criteria for how to best run a tour. To be labeled a GetYourGuide tour, an operator must agree to follow its best practices regarding meeting points, check-in processes, starting times, duration, and other factors. In return, the retailer will send more customers the operator's way.

In July 2018, Udi Nir was hired as chief technology officer. Nir previously was VP Engineering for Instacart and CTO of ModCloth.

In September 2018, Sharon McCollam, formerly head of finance at consumer electronics retailer Best Buy, was appointed to the board of directors.

In April 2019, GetYourGuide raised a $484 million investment from SoftBank Group. This infusion of capital raised its valuation above the $1 billion mark, making it a unicorn.

During the COVID-19 pandemic, revenues fell 95%. The company also shifted to remote work.

Corporate information

Partnerships
GetYourGuide has ancillary revenue partnerships with hundreds of airlines, hotels, transportation networks and online publishers, through which those businesses' customers can directly access its global inventory of tours & activities.

Former
AirBerlin
TUI
TripAdvisor

Current
easyJet
KLM
Interrail
Leonardo Hotels

Office locations

GetYourGuide maintains its headquarters in Berlin, and engineering offices in Zurich. 14 additional sales offices are maintained in: Sydney, Vienna, Paris, Hong Kong, Rome, Dubai, San Francisco, New York City, Bangkok, Cape Town, Barcelona, London, Rio de Janeiro and Tokyo.

Since 2012, GetYourGuide's corporate headquarters have been located in the former Goldpunkt shoe factory in Berlin's Prenzlauer Berg neighborhood. Plans are underway for a 2019 move to a former electrical substation built in the 1920s in Berlin's Prenzlauer Berg neighborhood. The renovated office will offer 11,700 m2 of floor space, with room for a headcount of 800.

References

External links 
 

Online travel agencies
Online marketplaces of Germany
Travel and holiday companies of Germany
Transport companies established in 2008
Privately held companies of Switzerland
Companies based in Zürich
Companies based in Berlin